Zubeen Garg is an Indian singer, music director, composer, lyricist, music producer, actor, film director, film producer, script writer and philanthropist. He primarily works for and sings in the Assamese, Bengali and Hindi-language film and music industries.

As a singer

As a composer

Hindi songs

Assamese songs

As a music director

References

Discographies of Indian artists